Pyramide may refer to:

 Pyramide, brand name in Japan and Thailand for pyrazinamide, an anti-tuberculosis drug
 Pyramide (benzamide), a group of benzamides, one of which is used as a fungicide
 Pyramidal tracts, anatomical feature, aggregations of nerve fibres from the spinal cord to the brain, sometimes referred to as "pyramides"
 Pyramide (patience), a double-deck solitaire card game
 Die Pyramide, a high-rise building in Berlin
 La Pyramide a restaurant in Vienne, Isère, France

See also
 Pyramid (disambiguation)